The 2014–15 Arizona Wildcats women's basketball team represented University of Arizona during the 2014–15 NCAA Division I women's basketball season. The Wildcats, led by seventh-year head coach Niya Butts, played their games at the McKale Center and were members of the Pac-12 Conference. They finished the season 10–20, 3–15 in Pac-12 play to finish in a tie for eleventh place. They lost in the first round of the Pac-12 women's tournament to UCLA.

Roster

Schedule

|-
!colspan=9 style="background:#CC0033; color:white;"|Exitbition

|-
!colspan=9 style="background:#CC0033; color:white;"|Regular Season

|-
!colspan=9 style="background:#CC0033;"|2015 Pac-12 Tournament

See also
2014–15 Arizona Wildcats men's basketball team

References

Arizona Wildcats women's basketball seasons
Arizona Wildcats
Arizona Wildcats
Ariz